Merry Aart (born 31 March 1953 in Elva) is an Estonian politician. She is a member of the XIV Riigikogu.

In 1982 she graduated from Estonian University of Life Sciences in zoological engineering.

1994-1999 she was the president of Estonian Association of Rural Consultants.

Since 2013 she is a member of Conservative People's Party of Estonia.

References

1953 births
21st-century Estonian politicians
21st-century Estonian women politicians
Conservative People's Party of Estonia politicians
Estonian University of Life Sciences alumni
Living people
Members of the Riigikogu, 2019–2023
People from Elva, Estonia
Women members of the Riigikogu